The Wheeler National Wildlife Refuge Warden's Residence, also known simply as Warden's Residence, is a house in Triana, Alabama. It was built in 1941 by the Civilian Conservation Corps to serve as the residence of the warden of Wheeler National Wildlife Refuge. It was used by the warden until 1947, and in 1950, the local clinic serving African Americans in the area was moved into the house.  The clinic was later desegregated, and operated until 1990.  Today, the house is the center of a  park run by the town.

The building was listed on the Alabama Register of Landmarks and Heritage in 2001 and the National Register of Historic Places in 2010.

References

Houses completed in 1941
National Register of Historic Places in Madison County, Alabama
Buildings and structures in Madison County, Alabama
Civilian Conservation Corps in Alabama
Houses on the National Register of Historic Places in Alabama